Malgassesia seyrigi is a moth of the family Sesiidae. It is known from northern Madagascar.

The wingspan of this species is 17 mm with a length of the forewings of 8 mm. The forewings are blackish, hindwings are hyaline (glass like). The holotype was collected by A. Seyrig at the Montagne d'Ambre.

References

Moths described in 1955
Sesiidae
Moths of Madagascar
Moths of Africa